The 2015 Russian Football Super Cup (Russian: Суперкубок России по футболу) was the 13th Russian Super Cup match, a football match which was contested between the 2014–15 Russian Premier League champion, Zenit Saint Petersburg, and the 2014–15 Russian Cup champion, Lokomotiv Moscow.

The match was held on 12 July 2015 at the Petrovsky Stadium, in Saint Petersburg.

Match details

Gallery

See also
2015–16 Russian Premier League
2015–16 Russian Cup

References

Super Cup
Russian Super Cup
Russian Super Cup 2015
Russian Super Cup 2015
Sports competitions in Saint Petersburg
Football in Saint Petersburg
Russian Super Cup 2015
July 2015 sports events in Russia